This is a list of Pakistani films to be released in 2020.
This year was greatly impacted by the COVID-19 pandemic, and numerous films originally scheduled for 2020 were postponed to 2021 as a result.

Releases

January – April

Events

Award ceremonies

References

2020
Lists of 2020 films by country or language
Films